Thomas Yale (1525/6–1577) was the Chancellor, Vicar general and Official Principal of the Head of the Church of England : Matthew Parker, 1st Archbishop of Canterbury, and later on, of Edmund Grindal, 2nd Archbishop of Canterbury, during the Elizabethan Religious Settlement. He was also Dean of the Arches and Ambassador to Queen Elizabeth Tudor at the Court of High Commission.

Early life

Dr. Thomas Yale was born in 1525 or 1526 to David Lloyd ap Ellis of Plas-yn-Yale, a member of the House of Yale. His grandfather, Ellis ap Griffith, was the Baron of Gwyddelwern, and a member of the Royal House of Mathrafal. This Ellis was a cousin of the Tudors, and a grandson of Lord Tudur ap Gruffudd, brother of Owen Glendower, last native Prince of Wales, and character in Shakespeare's play Henry IV. Thomas's great-uncle was Gruffydd Fychan Vaughan, Governor of Cilgerran Castle by Henry Tudor, with whom he fled to France, and was married to  Margaret Perrot of the family of Sir John Perrot, Lord Deputy of Ireland. As a member of the House of Corsygedol, a branch of the FitzGerald dynasty, the family had been previously given the command of Harlech Castle by Jasper Tudor, Earl of Pembroke. 

Thomas had two brothers, one named Roger, the other named John. Roger Lloyd Yale of Brynglas was Secretary to Cardinal Wolsey, along with Thomas Cromwell, and was married to Katherine, a daughter of William ap Griffith Vychan, Baron of Edeirnion and Lord of Kymmer-yn-Edeirnion. His patron, Cardinal Wolsey, was Henry VIII's chief minister, the owner of Hampton Court Palace, and England's most powerful man, next to the King, as Lord High Chancellor, and played a major role in the English Reformation. 

His other brother, John Wynn (Yale), the ancestor of the Yale family of America and Wales, was the father of Dr. David Yale of Erddig Park, Chancellor of Chester, who married Frances Lloyd, daughter of Admiralty Judge John Lloyd, a board member of the University of Oxford and cofounder with Queen Elizabeth I of the first protestant college at Oxford. David Yale became the great-grandfather of Governor Elihu Yale who gave his name to Yale University. 
His son, Thomas Yale Sr., was the father of the Yales who emigrated to America with the Eaton family, and was a cousin of Francis Willughby and Duchess Cassandra Willoughby of Wollaton Hall. Cassandra was related to Jane Austen, author of Pride and Prejudice.

David Yale was also the uncle of Elizabeth Weston, daughter of Knight Simon Weston, whose family was well connected with the Earls of Essex, having participated in their Rebellion and Expedition against the Tudors and Habsburgs. She became the wife of Robert Ridgeway, 2nd Earl of Londonderry, and sister-in-law of Sir Francis Willoughby, son of Sir Percival Willoughby. The Yales were members of the House of Yale and bore Coats of arms. The House is, on the paternal side, a cadet branch of the Royal House of Mathrafal, through the Princes of Powys Fadog, and a cadet branch of the Fitzgerald Dynasty, through the Merioneth House of Corsygedol. The Lord of Yale title historically belonged to this family.

Career

Thomas Yale graduated B.A. at Cambridge University in 1542–3, and was elected a Fellow, member of the governing body of Queen's College of the University of Cambridge about 1544. He commenced M.A. in 1546, and filled the office of Bursar to his college from 1549 to 1551. He was one of the Proctors of the University for the year commencing Michaelmas 1552, but resigned before the expiration of his term of office. In 1554 he was appointed Commissary of the Diocese of Ely under Chancellor John Fuller, and in 1555 he was Keeper of the Spiritualities of the Diocese of Bangor during the vacancy after the death of Arthur Bulkeley, Bishop of Bangor. In that year he subscribed the Roman Catholic articles imposed upon all graduates of the University.

During the reign of Queen Mary I, in November 1556, his name occurs in the commission for the suppression of heresy within the Diocese of Ely, and he assisted in the search for heretical books during the visitation of the University by Cardinal Pole's delegates. In January 1556–7 he was among those empowered by the Senate to reform the composition for the election of Proctors and to revise the University statutes. He was created Doctor of Laws in 1557, and admitted an advocate of the Court of Arches on 26 April 1559. In the same year, he and four other leading civilians, subscribed an opinion that the commission issued by Queen Elizabeth Tudor, for the consecration of Matthew Parker, as the new Head of the Anglican Church, was legally valid. The civilians were Lord Chancellor Robert Weston, Vice-Chancellor Henry Harvey, Bishop Nicholas Bullingham, and Master Edward Leeds.

Matthew Parker, a great friend of Lord William Cecil and Sir Nicholas Bacon, was previously the Chaplain of Elizabeth during her childhood and her mother, Queen Anne Boleyn. When Anne was arrested, he promised her that he would take care of the spiritual well being of her daughter, as she was going to be executed for treason. He later became the Chaplain of Elizabeth's father, King Henry VIII, and a close associate of Edward Seymour, 1st Duke of Somerset and John Dudley, 1st Duke of Northumberland. A few years later, Parker would also be of help to the Queen and Lord Cecil regarding the legitimacy of the Earldom of Edward de Vere, 17th Earl of Oxford, as his father John had a bigamous marriage with a mistress. As the young Edward was a ward of the Queen, none had interest of accepting the petition of Lord Windsor and Katherine de Vere, his half-sister. Archbishop Parker settled the marriage matters, and Lord Cecil took credit in a letter.

On 25 March 1560, Yale was admitted to the Prebend of Offley in Lichfield Cathedral. In the same year he became Rector of Leverington in the Isle of Ely. He, Alexander Nowell, Richard Turner, and other Archiepiscopal commissioners, were sent to visit the churches and Dioceses of Canterbury, Rochester, and Peterborough, meeting with Dean Nicholas Wotton, a Royal envoy of Charles V, Holy Roman Emperor. On 24 April 1561 the Archbishop commissioned him and Vice-Chancellor, Walter Wright to visit the church, city, and Diocese of Oxford.

Judge

Yale was part of the Cambridge Reformers who were responsible for Elizabeth Tudor’s education, and aided her in her subsequent rise to power. As a reward for validating the election of Matthew Parker as new head of the Anglican Church, she gave him positions. On 28 June 1561 he was constituted for life Judge of the Court of Audience, Official Principal, Chancellor, and Vicar general to the 1st Archbishop of Canterbury, and in the same year obtained the Rectory of Llantrisant, Anglesey. 

As a member of the household of Archbishop Matthew Parker, he now lived at Lambeth Palace in London. The maintenance of ecclesiastical discipline was one of the largest tasks of Elizabeth's administration. Visitations of Dioceses and courts were necessary to prevent or punish breaches of the laws of the church, and was a matter of considerable discussion and controversy in Tudor England. In 1562 he became Chancellor of the Diocese of Bangor in Wales, and in May, was commissioned by Matthew Parker, the Archbishop, to visit All Souls and Merton College at Oxford. In 1563 he was on a commission to visit the Diocese of Ely with John Pory and Edward Leeds. 
 
On 7 July 1564 he was instituted to the Prebend of Vaynoll in the Diocese of St Asaph. In 1566 he was one of the Masters in Ordinary of the Court of Chancery, and was placed on a commission to visit the Diocese of Bangor with Robert Weston, David Lewis, and Sir Ambrose Cave, Chancellor of the Duchy of Lancaster. In 1567 he was appointed Dean of the Arches, a post which he resigned in 1573. In 1570, Yale seems to have established an exclusive claim to the right to dispense and license in marriage matters, a function he delegated in 1573 to his commissary general. He was also one of the Commissioners, along with Attorney-General Gilbert Gerard and William Drury, for the visitation of the church and Diocese of Norwich. By a patent confirmed on 15 July 1571 he was constituted Joint-Keeper of the Prerogative court.

Later life

Thomas Yale married in 1561 Joanna (died 12 September 1587), daughter of Nicholas Waleron. Joanna was previously married to Ambassador Simon Heynes, who was one of those who invalidated the marriage of Henry VIII with Anne of Cleves, and charged for treason Sir Thomas Wyatt. She was then secondly married to the Archbishop of York, William May, who was the President of Queens' College, Cambridge. Her brother-in-law was the Bishop of Carlisle, John May, who previously served the House of de Vere. 

On Parker's death in 1575, Thomas acted as one of his executors. He was also godfather to Bishop Nicholas Bullingham's children. Matthew Parker's successor, the 2nd Archbishop of Canterbury, Edmund Grindal, the new Head of the Anglican Church, also appointed him Chancellor, Vicar general, Official Principal and Judge of his audience. On 23 April 1576 he was placed on a commission for repressing religious malcontents. On 2 May he and Nicholas Robinson, Bishop of Bangor, were empowered by Grindal to visit on his behalf the Diocese of Bangor, and on 17 August he and Gilbert Berkeley, Bishop of Bath and Wells, were similarly commissioned to visit the church at Wells. In the same year, Yale and Dr. William Aubrey represented to Grindal the need of reforms in the Court of Chancery. After disagreements with Elizabeth Tudor and Lord Cecil, the Queen suspended Archbishop Grindal in June 1577. Yale discharged his judicial duties for him and governed the whole Province of Canterbury, covering roughly two-thirds of England, continuing to rule until November, when he fell ill. He died in either November or December, 1577.

For many years, Yale was an ecclesiastical High Commissioner to Elizabeth Tudor at the Court of High Commission, assuming the role of Ambassador. As one of the leaders of the Anglican Church, he was featured with the Queen, the Archbishop Matthew Parker, the Chief minister Lord Burghley of Burghley House, the Earl Leicester of Kenilworth Castle, and many others, in the correspondence letters of Matthew Parker as they were governing the Church of England during the Elizabethan Religious Settlement. Some manuscript extracts by him entitled ‘Collecta ex Registro Archiepiscoporum Cantuar.’ are preserved among the Cottonian manuscripts (Cleopatra F. i. 267), and were printed in John Strype's Life of Parker, iii. 177–82. A statement of his case in a controversy for precedency with Bartholomew Clerke is among the Petyt manuscripts in the library of the Inner Temple. An elegy on Yale by Peter Leigh is preserved in the British Museum (Addit. MS. 26737, f. 43).

References

1520s births
1577 deaths
16th-century English educators
Alumni of the University of Cambridge
Fellows of Queens' College, Cambridge